Progressive People's Party (PPP) is a political party in Ghana. It was formed in 2012 by Paa Kwesi Nduom, the presidential candidate for the Convention People's Party in the 2008 general election. PPP pulled 64,267 popular votes in the 2012 general elections with Papa Kwesi Nduom as a flagbearer and Brigitte Dzogbenuku as the running mate, making it the third largest party and the second largest opposition party in Ghana.

The party's National Head Office Building is located in Asylum Down, Accra. The motto of the party is "Prosperity in Peace" with "Awake" as the slogan.

History
The party's formation was followed by a declaration on 28 December 2011 by Nduom for progressive and independent-minded people to come together and form an alternative political movement.

The interim leadership of the progressive movement began a nationwide campaign to recruit members to form Interim Regional and Constituency Executives. The team visited all ten regions of Ghana.

In January 2012, the party submitted an application to the Electoral Commission for registration in accordance with the Political Parties Act.

The party received its provisional certificate on Friday, February 3, 2012. The party went to the first National Convention on February 25, 2012, which was held at the Accra Sports Stadium. The Final Certificate was received on Thursday, March 15, 2012.

Claims 
PPP seeks power to implement an agenda for change built on Stewardship, Education, Healthcare and Jobs. PPP plans to implement the agenda using the spirit of inclusiveness, and full participation of women and youth. Most importantly, PPP has stated that it will maintain an incorruptible leadership.

Structure
The Party elected officers in two-thirds of the districts in Ghana as well as Regional Executives. Elected National Officers of the party include: Nii Allotey Brew Hammond, chairperson; William Doworkpor, First Vice Chairperson; Ban Saliah, Second Vice Chairperson; Belinda Bulley, Third Vice Chairperson, Murtala Ahmed Mohammad, National Secretary; Felix William Ogwah, National Treasurer; Nana Ofori Owusu, Director of Operations; Vivian Tetteh, Women Coordinator; Divine Nkrumah, Youth Coordinator; Kofi Asamoah Siaw, Policy Adviser; Deroy Kwesi Andrew, Director of Research; Richard Nii Amarh, executive director and Paa Kow Ackon, Director of Communication.

Election performance

Parliamentary elections

Presidential elections

References

2012 establishments in Ghana
Liberal parties in Africa
Political parties established in 2012
Political parties in Ghana
Progressive parties
Social liberal parties